Radhanagar may refer to:

 Radhanagar, Nadia in Nadia district of West Bengal, India
 Radhanagore (also spelt Radhanagar) in Hooghly District of West Bengal, India
 Radhanagar, Bankura in Bankura district, West Bengal, India
 Radhanagar, Sonarpur in West Bengal, India
 Radhanagar, Paschim Medinipur, a village in West Bengal, India
 Radhanagar, Sahibganj, a village in West Bengal, India